Uppland Wing, also F 16 Uppsala, or simply F 16, is a Swedish Air Force wing with the main base located at Ärna Air Base northwest of Uppsala, Sweden.

History
F 16 was established by buying farmland from Ärna gård and Bärby gård in 1943. The grass fields were used as runways for the air base that was founded in 1944.

The airbase was well outside the city limits of Uppsala at the time of the founding, but because of city growth, it later was adopted in as a suburb under the name Ärna as the population near the base and the city grew together.

The original emblem of F 16 was a golden sheaf of grain on a blue shield, but when F 2 Hägernäs airbase was decommissioned in 1974, F 16 took over its coat of arms of Uppland.

The Swedish government decided in 1996 that the wing with the squadrons would be decommissioned on 31 December 2003. The base was thereafter still active with various military schools. The base was also home to F 20 Uppsala Air Force Academy.

The wing was re-raised and was inaugurated on 14 October 2021 to the tunes from Uppland Home Guard Music Band (Upplands hemvärnsmusikkår). The wing was inaugurated by Prince Carl Philip, Duke of Värmland. The Supreme Commander of the Swedish Armed Forces, General Micael Bydén and the Minister of Defence Peter Hultqvist also attended the inauguration. The ceremony ended with a formation flight over Uppsala Garrison and downtown Uppsala. It was carried out by the Swedish Air Force Historic Flight (SWAFHF), together with the Swedish Armed Forces. The formation consisted of older aircraft models that had been active in Uppland Wing over the years.

Heraldry and traditions

Coat of arms
The first coat of arms of the Uppland Wing was used from 1943 to 1994. Blazon: "Azure, the badge of the dynasty Vasa, a ”vase” or". The second coat of arms was used from 1994 to 2003. Blazon: "Gules, the provincial badge of Uppland, an orb or, banded and ensigned with a cross-crosslet, a chief azure over a barrulet or, charged with a winged twobladed propeller of the last colour".

Colours, standards and guidons
The units first colour was presented to the wing on 17 September 1944 at F 8 at Barkarby by His Majesty the King Gustaf V. Blazon: "On blue cloth in the centre the badge of the Air Force; a winged two-bladed propeller under a royal crown proper. In the first corner, the badge of the House of Vasa, a ”vase” or".

The units last colour was presented to the wing at the Artillery Yard in Stockholm by the Supreme Commander, General Owe Wiktorin on 30 April 1996. It was handed over to the Uppsala Air Force Training schools (F 20) as a traditional colour when F 16 was disbanded on 31 December 2003. The colour is drawn by Ingrid Lamby and manufactured by machine in appliqué technique by the Engelbrektsson Flag factory. Blazon: "On blue cloth in the centre the badge of the Air Force; a winged two-bladed propeller under a royal crown proper. In the first corner the provincial badge of Uppland; an orb, banded and ensigned with a cross crosslet and in the second corner a seven-pointed star (a legacy from seven disbanded wings: the former Västmanland Wing (F 1), Roslagen Wing (F 2), Östgöta Wing (F 3), Svea Wing (F 8), Södermanland Wing (F 11), Bråvalla Wing (F 13) and Södertörn Wing (F 18). All décor in yellow.

March
”Upplands flygflottiljs marsch” with the work name ”Svensk högvakt” was composed around 1950 by the music director Per Berg and was adopted on 15 June 1971 and established on 26 April 1976.

Medals
In 2003, the Upplands flygflottiljs (F 16) minnesmedalj ("Uppland Wing (F 16) Commemorative Medal") in bronze (UpplffljBMM) of the 8th size was established. The medal ribbon is of blue moiré with a yellow stripe on the middle and a broad red stripe on each side. The wing coat of arms is attached to the ribbon.

Commanding officers
From 1943 to 1981, the commanding officers was referred to as flottiljchef ("wing commander"), and had the rank of colonel. From 1981 to 1994, the wing commander was referred to as sektorflottiljchef ("sector wing commander") and had the rank of senior colonel. From 1994 to 2003, the commanding officer was again referred to as flottiljchef ("wing commander"), and had the rank of colonel.

Wing and sector wing commanders

1943–1944: Bengt Jacobsson
1944–1952: Knut Lindahl
1952–1964: Karl-Erik Karlsson
1964–1967: Björn Hedberg
1967–1971: Gösta Norrbohm
1971–1973: Sven-Olof Olson
1973–1976: Jan-Henrik Torselius
1976–1978: Bertil Nordström
1978–1985: Karl-Erik Fernander
1985–1989: Rolf Gustafsson
1989–1990: Arne Hansson
1990–1994: Stig Dellborg
1994–1997: Ulf Sveding
1997–1999: Mats Nilsson
1999–2002: Tommy Pålsson
2002–2003: Christer Olofsson
2004–2021: –
2021–20xx: Pernille Undén

Deputy sector wing commanders
In order to relieve the sector wing commander, a deputy sector wing commander position was added in 1981. Its task was to lead the unit procurement, a task largely similar to the old wing commander position. Hence he was also referred to as flottiljchef ("wing commander"). The deputy sector wing commander had the rank of colonel. On 30 June 1994, the deputy sector wing commander position was terminated.

1981–1983: Lars-Erik Englund
1983–1985: Jan-Olov Gezelius
1985–1988: Hans Hagberg
1988–1990: Swen Persson
1990–1992: Kjell Nilsson
1992–1993: Ulf Sveding

Names, designations and locations

See also
 List of military aircraft of Sweden

Footnotes

References

Notes

Print

Web

Further reading

External links

 Latin mottos of Swedish Armed Forces units (in Swedish)

Wings of the Swedish Air Force
Military units and formations established in 1943
Military units and formations disestablished in 2003
Military units and formations established in 2021
1943 establishments in Sweden
2003 disestablishments in Sweden
2021 establishments in Sweden
Uppsala Garrison